Robert de Comines (died 28 January 1069) (also Robert de Comines, Robert de Comyn) was very briefly Earl of Northumbria.

Life
His name suggests that he originally came from Comines, then in the County of Flanders, and entered the following of William the Conqueror. 
He was sent to the north as earl from 1068 to 1069 after the deposition of Gospatric.  
He got as far as Durham with his 700 men, where the bishop, Ethelwin, warned him that an army was mobilised against him.  
He ignored the advice and, on 28 January 1069, the rebels converged on Durham and killed many of his men in the streets, eventually setting fire to the bishop's house where Robert was staying.  He was consumed by the blaze.

After this attack, Ethelwin turned against the Normans and gathered an army in Durham before marching on York, leading to the Harrying of the North in retaliation by King William's army.

Issue
Robert de Comines was the father of two sons:
John de Comyn (died c. 1135), killed during The Anarchy, married the daughter and co-heiress of Adam Giffard of Fonthill, had issue.
William de Comyn (died c. 1158), Lord Chancellor to David I of Scotland and Archdeacon of Worcester in 1125 and 1157.

Notes

Sources

Stenton, Frank M. Anglo-Saxon England. 3rd ed. Oxford University Press: Oxford, 1971.

1069 deaths
11th-century English nobility
Anglo-Normans
Robert
People from the county of Flanders
Year of birth unknown
Earls of Northumbria (Peerage of England)